Spider-Man Lives: A Miles Morales Story is a 2015 Spider-Man fan film.

Plot
In the wake of Peter Parker's death, a boy named Miles Morales finds the courage to put on the mask and become Spider-Man.

Cast
Demetrius Stephens as Miles Morales / Spider-Man
Juliana Thornhill as Rio Morales
Michael J. Patterson as Jefferson Davis
Diane Samuelson as Lana Baumgartner
Tyris Lee as Young Henchman
Patrick McDaniel as Frank Oliver
Terence Heffernan as Police Officer

Reception
Joey Paur of Geektyrant stated that someone who is a fan of Spider-Man, specifically the Miles Morales version of the web-slinger, would probably enjoy the film. He also stated that the film gave a solid idea of what a live-action version of the character might be like.

See also
 Spider-Man, a 1969 fan film
 Spider-Man Versus Kraven the Hunter, a 1974 fan film
 The Green Goblin's Last Stand, a 1992 fan film
 Viva Spider-Man, a 1989 fan film

References

External links
 
 

Spider-Man fan films
Short films based on Marvel Comics
2010s English-language films
2010s American films